Drivetrain is the twelfth studio album by the southern rock band 38 Special, released in 2004.

Eight of the album's 12 songs were co-written by long-time collaborator Jim Peterik.

Track listing
"Something I Need" (Don Barnes, Jim Peterik) – 3:57
"Hurts Like Love" (Barnes, Danny Chauncey, Peterik) – 4:40
"Haley's Got a Harley" (Barnes, Peterik, Donnie Van Zant, Johnny Van Zant) – 4:02
"Jam On" (Barnes, Chauncey, Peterik) – 4:56
"Make Some Sense of It" (Barnes, Peterik) – 4:39
"Quick Fix" (Peterik, D. Van Zant) – 3:55
"The Squeeze" (Barnes, Jeff Carlisi, Chauncey, D. Van Zant, Robert White Johnson) – 5:03
"The Play" (Barnes, Chauncey, Gary Moffatt) – 5:12
"Bad Looks Good on You" (Barnes, Chauncey, Andrew Ramsey) – 5:01
"Trooper with an Attitude" (Barnes) – 3:26
"Hiding from Yourself" (Peterik, D. Van Zant) – 5:04
"Sheriff's County Line" (Barnes, Peterik, D. Van Zant, J. Van Zant) – 5:07

Soundtracks
The album was used in the Broken Lizard movie Super Troopers with "Trooper with an Attitude" as an introduction for the movie.

Personnel
Don Barnes – co-lead & background guitars, lead and background vocals
Marke "Jellyroll" Burgstahler – slide guitar, additional guitar solos
Bobby Capps – keyboards, background vocals
Danny Chauncey – co-lead & background guitars, keyboards
Larry Junstrom – bass guitar
Gary Moffatt – drums
Greg Morrow – drums & percussion
Donnie Van Zant – lead and background vocals, rhythm and acoustic guitars

Production
Producers: Don Barnes, Danny Chauncey
Engineers: Danny Chauncey, Ben Strano, Alan Yates
Digital editing: Don Barnes, Bobby Capps, Danny Chauncey
Mixing: Joe Hardy
Mastering: Don Cobb
Design: Traci Goudie
Photography: Traci Goudie

38 Special (band) albums
2004 albums
Sanctuary Records albums